Studholme is a surname, and may refer to:

 Allan Studholme (1946–1919), Canadian trade unionist
 Edgar Studholme (1866–1949), New Zealand cricketer
 Gilfred Studholme (1740–1792), British military commander during the American Revolution
 Henry Studholme (1899–1987), British politician, son of William 
 Studholme Baronets, hereditary title created for Henry Studholme in 1956
 John Studholme (1829–1903), New Zealand politician
 Marie Studholme (1872–1930), English actress
 Marion Studholme (1927–2016), English soprano
 Paul Studholme (1930–1990), British Army officer 
 William Studholme (1864–1941), New Zealand cricketer, son of John